Milutin Minja was a Yugoslav basketball player and coach. He represented the Yugoslavia national basketball team internationally.

Playing career 
Minja started his basketball career with Radnički Kristal from Zrenjanin. In 1953, he signed for a Zrenjanin-based team Proleter.

During his stint with Proleter, Minja won the National Championships in the 1956 season. Minja was a part of the group of players known as the Proleter's Five, which included himself, Lajos Engler, Ljubomir Katić, Dušan Radojčić, and Vilmos Lóczi.

In 1957, Minja moved to a Belgrade powerhouse Crvena zvezda where he played for two seasons. In the 1958 season, Minja averaged 12.9 points per game while appearing in 15 games. In the 1959 season, he averaged 13.4 points per game while appearing in 17 games. In 1960, he got two-year suspension after had got caught smuggling on the Poland tour.

National team career
Minja was a member of the Yugoslavia national team that participated at the 1955 FIBA European Championship in Budapest, Hungary. Over nine tournament games, he averaged 6.5 points per game. At the 1957 FIBA European Championship in Sofia, Bulgaria, he averaged 10.9 points per game over nine tournament games. At the 1959 FIBA European Championship in Istanbul, Turkey, he averaged 9.7 points per game over six tournament games.

Minja was a member of the national team that won the gold medal at the 1959 Mediterranean Games in Lebanon.

Coaching career 
Minja coached both Vojvodina men's and women's team from Novi Sad during 1970s.

Career achievements and awards 
 Yugoslav League champion: 1 (with Proleter Zrenjanin: 1956).
 Plaque of the Basketball Federation of Serbia (2016, posthumous)

In popular culture 
 The 2016 Serbian documentary, Šampioni iz pedeset i šeste, portrays Minja and the achievements of the Proleter basketball team in the mid 1950s and how they won the Yugoslav Championship in 1956.

References

1930s births
Competitors at the 1959 Mediterranean Games
Mediterranean Games gold medalists for Yugoslavia
KK Crvena zvezda players
KK Proleter Zrenjanin players
KK Vojvodina coaches
Serbian men's basketball players
Serbian men's basketball coaches
Yugoslav men's basketball players
Yugoslav basketball coaches
Date of birth missing
Date of death missing
Place of birth missing
Place of death missing
Mediterranean Games medalists in basketball
Shooting guards